The year 2010 is the 3rd year in the history of DREAM, a mixed martial arts promotion based in Japan. In 2010 DREAM held 5 events beginning with, Dream 13.

Title fights

Events list

Dream 13

Dream 13 was an event held on March 22, 2010 at the Yokohama Arena in Yokohama, Kanagawa, Japan.

Results

Dream 14

Dream 14 was an event held on May 29, 2010 at the Saitama Super Arena in Saitama, Saitama, Japan.

Results

Dream 15

Dream 15 was an event held on July 10, 2010 at the Saitama Super Arena in Saitama, Saitama, Japan.

Results

Dream 16

Dream 16 was an event held on September 25, 2010 at the Nippon Gaishi Hall in Nagoya, Aichi, Japan.

Results

Dynamite!! 2010

Dynamite!! 2010 was an event held on December 31, 2010 at the Saitama Super Arena in Saitama, Saitama, Japan.

Results

See also 
 DREAM

References

Dream (mixed martial arts) events
2010 in mixed martial arts